The 1561 siege of Odawara, a battle of Japan's Sengoku period, Uesugi Kenshin attacked Odawara castle, this was the first of several sieges which would befall Odawara castle, the home castle of the Hōjō clan.

Background
In 1559, Kenshin was pushed once again by Uesugi Norimasa to take control of the Kantō back from the Hōjō, and in 1560 he was able to comply. In August of the same year, he put southern Echigo under control of a five-man council for broad mobilization, as well formed a small investigative council for any kind of unrest. then, in 1561 he march to Odawara.

The siege
Uesugi Kenshin was at the height of his campaign against the Hōjō clan, as he captured several of their castles. Later, he besieged the Hōjō's Odawara Castle. The Uesugi breached the defenses, and burned the castle town. However, Kenshin would withdraw after two months. This came as the result of a lack of adequate supplies, and the reappearance of Takeda Shingen, Kenshin's long-time rival, who was threatening his territories.

Aftermath
The castle itself however remained unconquered; This ended the first of three sieges of the Odawara castle.

References
 Turnbull, Stephen (1998). 'The Samurai Sourcebook'. London: Cassell & Co.

1561 in Japan
Odawara 1561
Odawara 1561
Conflicts in 1561